Zed Plus is a 2014 Bollywood comedy-drama film directed by Chandraprakash Dwivedi. The film  features Adil Hussain as one of many lead characters, including Mona Singh, Mukesh Tiwari, Kulbhushan Kharbanda, Sanjay Mishra, Shivani Tanksale, Vinod Aacharya and Ekavali Khanna. The film released on 26 December 2014

Cast
 Aslam Puncturewala: Adil Hussain
 Hameeda (Aslam’s Wife): Mona Singh
 Habib (Aslam’s Neighbor): Mukesh Tiwari
 Hidayatulla: Sanjay Mishra
 Prime Minister : Kulbhushan Kharbanda
 Inspector Rajesh (Head of Zed Security): Rahul Singh
 Fauziya (Habib’s Wife): Shivani Tanksale
 J Dixit (OSD to Prime Minister): K. K. Raina
 Saeeda (Aslam’s love interest): Ekavali Khanna
 News Reporter:  Sanjeev Rathore
 Chief Minister of Rajasthan: Dr. Anil Rastogi
 Assistant of Hidayatulla : Vinod Aacharya

Soundtrack

References

External links
 
 Youtube.com
 Pinterest.com

2014 films
2010s Hindi-language films
Indian comedy-drama films
2014 comedy-drama films
Films directed by Chandraprakash Dwivedi